Erik Gustaf "Berka" Bergqvist (20 June 1891 – 17 February 1954) was a Swedish water polo player and freestyle swimmer who competed in the 1912 and 1920 Summer Olympics; he was part of the Swedish water polo teams that won silver and bronze medals, respectively. In 1912 he also competed in the 100 m freestyle.

Besides water sports, Bergqvist won a Swedish football title with AIK as a goalkeeper. He was one of three founders of the company AB Tipstjänst, which in 1934 received the state license to organize gambling and betting in sport, as those were going out of control in the 1920s–30s. The company was nationalized in 1943, and Bergqvist was offered the post of its Director General, on condition that he joins the Swedish Social Democratic Party. He refused, and was appointed as inspector general instead.

See also
 List of Olympic medalists in water polo (men)

References

External links
 

1891 births
1954 deaths
Swedish male water polo players
Swedish male freestyle swimmers
Olympic swimmers of Sweden
Olympic water polo players of Sweden
Swimmers at the 1912 Summer Olympics
Water polo players at the 1912 Summer Olympics
Water polo players at the 1920 Summer Olympics
Olympic silver medalists for Sweden
Olympic bronze medalists for Sweden
Olympic medalists in water polo
Medalists at the 1920 Summer Olympics
Medalists at the 1912 Summer Olympics
Swedish footballers
AIK Fotboll players
Stockholms KK water polo players
Stockholms KK swimmers
Association football goalkeepers
Sportspeople from Stockholm